Angelo Dumitru Alistar (born 2 August 1975) is a Romanian former professional footballer who plays as a defender.

Children: -Bianca Alistar 

-Tudor Alistar

Honours
Dinamo București
Liga I: 2003–04
Cupa României: 2003–04, 2004–05

References

External links
 
 

1975 births
Living people
Sportspeople from Piatra Neamț
Romanian footballers
Association football defenders
Liga I players
Liga II players
CSM Ceahlăul Piatra Neamț players
FC U Craiova 1948 players
FC Dinamo București players
CS Otopeni players
FC Internațional Curtea de Argeș players
Israeli Premier League players
Hapoel Petah Tikva F.C. players
Romanian expatriate footballers
Romanian expatriate sportspeople in Israel
Expatriate footballers in Israel